Slipknot is the debut studio album by American heavy metal band Slipknot. It was released on June 29, 1999, by Roadrunner Records, following a demo containing a few of the songs which had previously been released in 1998. Later, it was reissued in December 1999 with a slightly-altered track listing and mastering as the result of a lawsuit. It was the first release by the band to be produced by Ross Robinson, who sought to refine Slipknot's sound rather than alter the group's musical direction. This is the only album to feature original guitarist Josh Brainard who left at the end of recording in late 1998 while the band was taking a brief break. Jim Root, who recorded two tracks at this point, would appear full time on subsequent albums.

The album spans several genres, but is generally noted for its extensive percussion and overall heavy sound. It was well received by fans and critics alike and was responsible for bringing Slipknot a large increase in popularity. The album peaked at number 51 on the Billboard 200, and has gone on to become certified double platinum in the United States, making it the band's best-selling album. In 2011, it was voted the best debut album of the last 25 years by readers of Metal Hammer magazine.

Recording and production 
In 1997, following the band's demo release, Mate. Feed. Kill. Repeat., the members of Slipknot continued to write new material and work in SR Audio, a local studio, with new vocalist Corey Taylor. The band began to work on a follow-up, but were never able to go further than pre-production. Songs written and recorded in this period include "Slipknot", "Gently", "Do Nothing", "Tattered and Torn", "Heartache and a Pair of Scissors", "Me Inside", "Coleslaw", "Carve", "Windows", and "May 17". In 1998, Slipknot was receiving growing attention from record labels, including Epic and Hollywood Records.

On September 29, 1998, Slipknot left Des Moines, Iowa, and relocated at Indigo Ranch Studios in Malibu, California, anxious to record an album after a long wait to be signed. During that time, its members attended a show by avant-garde metal supergroup Fantômas, fronted by Mike Patton (whom the band already admired from his work with Mr. Bungle and Faith No More). Fantômas went on to greatly influence Slipknot's new music. After recording a new demo, Slipknot released it to prospective labels and producers; the track "Spit It Out" was the main focus in it and, with help from their manager Sophia John, they were able to supply a copy of the eponymous demo to Ross Robinson. The band wanted him to work with them on their debut album, and, after meeting with the band, Robinson signed them to his own label, I Am, but later helped sign them to Roadrunner Records.

The album's recording process was "very aggressive and chaotic", as producer Robinson strove to capture the intensity that the band created when performing live. Within three days all the drums were recorded, which contributed to the raw, live sound on the album that the band considered integral to its musical direction. Robinson played a big part in the stylistic change of the band, convincing them to cut off the more experimental sections and guitar solos in favor of a straightforward metal sound. By November 11, 1998, the recording of the album seemed complete and the band returned to Des Moines. During the Christmas period, guitarist Josh Brainard, who recorded on all the tracks to that point, left the band. The reasons for his departure were unclear; it was widely thought to have been because of family constraints, however, Brainard dispeled these rumours, explaining that "some decisions were made that I wasn't particularly happy with." His replacement was Jim Root, with whom the band returned to the studio in February 1999. Slipknot finished recording during this period, with two extra songs: a re-recording of "Me Inside", and a new track called "Purity". The mixing stages turned out to be very challenging, as drummer Joey Jordison and producer Robinson mastered the entire album with analog equipment, instead of the then more common method of using digital formats. "Wait and Bleed" and "Spit It Out", which also appeared on the demo prior to the album, were released on the album, also; the demo songs "Interloper" and "Despise" are available on the digipak version of the same album.

Musical and lyrical themes 

Slipknot's musical style is constantly contested; the genres in which the band are categorized vary depending on the source. However, this album is regarded as nu metal, while showing influences of other genres. Joey Jordison stated, "The roots are death metal, thrash metal, speed metal, and I could go on and on about all those bands." The album also shows influences from alternative metal and even rap metal. Critics have also noted an industrial influence.

The band's use of percussion, turntables, and samples gave the album a dense, layered sound. Alternative Press hailed the "inventive sampling, creative guitar work and an absolute percussive overload", while Q described the album as "a terrifying racket". Slipknot also includes melody, notably in the single "Wait and Bleed".

"742617000027", the intro, named after the barcode of Mate. Feed. Kill. Repeat., contains guitar scratches and abstract sound samples by sampler Craig Jones. Some of the dialogue was reportedly taken from a Charles Manson documentary. The dialogue is, "The whole thing, I think it's sick." In an interview shortly after the album was released, Jordison claimed the voice is Corey Taylor's, sped up. "(sic)", recalled Jordison, was written "at the very first rehearsal I had with Slipknot, on September 15, 1995. We were called The Pale Ones then and the song was originally called "Slipknot". It sounded completely different as Corey wasn't in the picture at that point." (Corey Taylor appeared on Slipknot's second demo, which resulted in them signing to Roadrunner Records.) "Paul [Gray, bassist] and I wrote the song together many years before we started Slipknot," said Shawn Crahan. "We basically had the riff and the drum beat. But it wasn't '(sic)' until everyone else was in the band and we brought it to [producer] Ross [Robinson]." "All of us were in the same room when we recorded this. It was hilarious. Everyone had their headphones tied to their head so we could all slam and go crazy while we played. Ross was throwing potted plants at Joey. It was the most insane thing I'd ever seen." Rick Anderson of AllMusic noted that on "Scissors", Taylor "sounds like he's about to burst into tears." Taylor's aggressive, expletive-filled lyrics were noted by AllMusic: "[the] lyrics that are discernible are not generally quotable on a family website; suffice it to say that the members of Slipknot are not impressed with their fathers, their hometown or most anything else."

"Eeyore" – a hidden track at the end of "Scissors" – begins after dialogue shared among the band members, recorded while they were viewing a scene in a pornographic film that involved coprophilia. It has been played live many times and appears on the DVD Disasterpieces and the live album 9.0: Live.

Critical reception 

Slipknot received acclaim by critics and fans; following its release the band gained popularity beyond their own expectations. Reviewing for AllMusic, Rick Anderson awarded the album four out of five stars, calling it "an auspicious debut" and proclaimed, "You thought Limp Bizkit was hard? They're The Osmonds. These guys are something else entirely. And it's pretty impressive." The album's aggression and heavy sound was widely praised; Rolling Stone stated Slipknot is "metal with a capital m", Kerrang! added "raw and wholly uncompromising, each track delivered a powerful blow to the senses", and in 2001, Q magazine included the album in their list "50 Heaviest Albums of All Time". CMJ ranked the album as the twelfth highest "Editorial Pick" for 1999. The album was also included in the book 1001 Albums You Must Hear Before You Die by Robert Dimery. Jon Hotten of Classic Rock magazine described Slipknot's "scary, genre-busting debut" as a "clever synthesis of a slasher movie aestethics with some grindingly heavy metal" and judged the band as apparently not "built to endure".

In 2021, it was named one of the 20 best metal albums of 1999 by Metal Hammer magazine.

Commercial performance 
A single from the album, "Wait and Bleed", was nominated for Best Metal Performance at the 2001 Grammy Awards, but lost to Deftones' "Elite". The song was also named the 36th greatest metal song of all time by VH1. The release of the album and the touring which followed greatly increased the band's popularity. The album became the "biggest selling extreme metal album" at the time. It was ranked by American SoundScan as the fastest-selling metal debut in SoundScan's history. On May 2, 2000, the album was certified platinum by the Recording Industry Association of America (RIAA), a first for any album released by Roadrunner Records. On February 5, 2005, the RIAA certified Slipknot's self-titled album double platinum. In Canada, the Canadian Recording Industry Association certified the album as platinum on June 10, 2000. The British Phonographic Industry certified Slipknot's self-titled album as platinum on October 17, 2008, in the UK. The song "Tattered & Torn" was sampled by punk rap group Ho99o9 on their song "Mega City Nine".

Controversy 
After the album's release, the band had to remove two tracks after allegations of copyright infringement. "Purity" and "Frail Limb Nursery" were inspired by a story, published online, about a girl named Purity Knight, who was kidnapped and buried alive. The website, called Crime Scene, presents fictional stories as real life crime cases. Originally, the website included no disclaimer saying that it was a work of fiction. Many readers believed the story to be true, including Corey Taylor: "I still think the story's real. It fucked our whole world up when we read it. Can you imagine a girl being buried in a box and have all this lecherous bullshit drip down on her from this guy? It just hurts your head."

The case was complicated by audio samples from the authoring website being included in "Frail Limb Nursery", the prelude to "Purity".

'Purity', said Taylor, "was originally called 'Despise' but it didn't work when we tried to put it together… Ross [Robinson] took it and helped us restructure it." In a Q&A, Taylor claimed the lyrics had been written five years prior to the song's release, that only the name had been inspired by the Purity Knight story and that inspiration came from films such as Boxing Helena and The Collector, and not the story.

However, Slipknot, to prevent the entire album being pulled, removed "Purity" and "Frail Limb Nursery". Slightly remastered standard and digipak versions of the album were issued in December 1999, replacing both tracks with "Me Inside". Although "Frail Limb Nursery" was never rereleased, "Purity" was included on the DVD Disasterpieces, the live 9.0: Live, the 'best of' Antennas to Hell, and the 10th anniversary edition of Slipknot.

10th Anniversary edition 
On September 9, 2009, Slipknot released a special edition version of the album to commemorate the tenth anniversary of its release. It was released in two forms, a digipak and a box set. The release date (09/09/09) is a reference to the fact that the band had nine members and had at that point sustained the same lineup since the original release of the album. The special edition box set includes: a CD and DVD set featuring all new digipak packaging, with a total of 25 songs including the original album with "Purity" (minus the prelude "Frail Limb Nursery") plus several previously unreleased cuts and demo tracks. The DVD, which was directed by percussionist Shawn Crahan, features footage of the band in 1999 and 2000, titled Of the Sic: Your Nightmares, Our Dreams. The DVD also features all three music videos released in support of the album, an entire live concert recorded at the Dynamo Open Air, 2000 and "other surprises". A "super deluxe" box set version of the re-release contains a T-shirt, patch, collectible cards, key chain, beanie and a note from vocalist Corey Taylor, and comes in packaging that resembles a safety deposit box.

Track listing 
All songs written and composed by Shawn Crahan, Paul Gray, Joey Jordison and Corey Taylor except where noted:

Both tracks are omitted completely from the reissue.

On the digital version, the 5 minute silence and "Mudslide" were omitted from "Scissors", and "Eeyore" is its own separate track.

Sample credits
"742617000027" contains part of an interview from Manson
"(sic)" contains sample from Carlito's Way, performed by Al Pacino
"Eyeless" contains samples of "Ease Yourself", as performed by The Collective
"Surfacing" contains sample of track 72 of Norman Cook's Skip to My Loops sample library
"Spit It Out" contains sample of "Papa Lover" (Dark Remix), as performed by General Degree and remixed by DJ Stretch; and dialogue from The Exorcist (hyper version only)
"Frail Limb Nursery" contains sample of voice Purity Knight from crimescene.com
"Prosthetics" contains sample of "Scream for Daddy", as performed by Ish Ledesma
"Diluted" contains dialogue from Cemetery Man
"Only One" contains sample of "South of Heaven", as performed by Slayer
"Eeyore" contains sample of "Man's Best Friend", as performed by Ice Cube; and sample from Duke Nukem 3D video game, voiced by Jon St. John
"Interloper" contains dialogue from Falling Down; sample of "It's Yours", as performed by T La Rock & Jazzy Jay; and dialogue from Shakes the Clown

Personnel 

Slipknot
 (#8) Corey Taylor – vocals
 (#7) Mick Thomson – guitars
 (#6) Shawn "Clown" Crahan - percussion, backing vocals 
 (#5) Craig "133" Jones - samples, media
 (#4) Jim Root – guitars on "Purity"
 Ex–(#4) Josh Brainard – guitars 
 (#3) Chris Fehn – percussion, backing vocals , vomit on "Mudslide" 
 Ex–(#3) Greg "Cuddles" Welts – percussion 
 (#2) Paul Gray - bass, backing vocals
 (#1) Joey Jordison - drums, mixing
 (#0) Sid Wilson - turntables

Production
 Ross Robinson – producer, mixing
 Rob Agnello – engineering
 Chuck Johnson – engineering, mixing
 Joey Jordison and Sean McMahon – additional mixing
 Kevin Miles – mixing
 Steven Remote – location recording engineer
 Eddy Schreyer – mastering at Oasis Mastering, Studio City, California

Artwork
 Stefan Seskis – album cover, tray card photography
 Dean Karr – band photography
 T42Design – album design, lettering
 Lynda Kusnetz – creative director
 Slipknot – packing concept

Management
 Steve Richards – worldwide management for No Name Management
 Ross Robinson – A&R
 Monte Conner – A&R for Roadrunner Records
 Jeffrey Light – legal representation
 Dave Kirby – booking for The Agency Group

Charts

Weekly charts

Year-end charts

Certifications

Appearance in media 

"Snap" was featured on the soundtrack for the film Freddy vs. Jason.
"Eyeless" appeared on an episode of The Sopranos.
An edited version of "(sic) (Molt-Injected mix)" appeared on the 2002 album NASCAR on Fox: Crank it Up!.

Release history

References

Sources
 
 

1999 debut albums
Roadrunner Records albums
Slipknot (band) albums
Albums produced by Ross Robinson
Nu metal albums by American artists